Bannack is a ghost town in Beaverhead County, Montana, United States, located on Grasshopper Creek, approximately  upstream from where Grasshopper Creek joins with the Beaverhead River south of Dillon. Founded in 1862, the town is a National Historic Landmark managed by the state of Montana as Bannack State Park.

History

Founded in 1862 and named after the local Bannock natives, Bannack was the site of a major gold discovery in 1862, and served as the capital of Montana Territory briefly in 1864, until the capital was moved to Virginia City. Bannack continued as a mining town, though with a dwindling population. The last residents left in the 1970s.

At its peak, Bannack had a population of about ten thousand. Extremely remote, it was connected to the rest of the world only by the Montana Trail. There were three hotels, three bakeries, three blacksmith shops, two stables, two meat markets, a grocery store, a restaurant, a brewery, a billiard hall, and four saloons. Though all of the businesses were built of logs, some had decorative false fronts.

Among the town's founders was Dr. Erasmus Darwin Leavitt, a physician born in Cornish, New Hampshire, who gave up medicine for a time to become a gold miner. Dr. Leavitt arrived in Bannack in 1862, and alternately practiced medicine and mined for gold with pick and shovel. "Though some success crowned his labors," according to a history of Montana by Joaquin Miller, "he soon found that he had more reputation as a physician than as a miner, and that there was greater profit in allowing someone else to wield his pick and shovel while he attended to his profession." Subsequently, Dr. Leavitt moved on to Butte, Montana, where he devoted the rest of his life to his medical practice 

Bannack's sheriff, Henry Plummer, was accused by some of secretly leading a ruthless band of road agents, with early accounts claiming that this gang was responsible for over a hundred murders in the Virginia City and Bannack gold fields and trails to Salt Lake City. However, because only eight deaths are historically documented, some modern historians have called into question the exact nature of Plummer's gang, while others deny the existence of the gang altogether. In any case, Plummer and two compatriots, both deputies,  were hanged, without trial, at Bannack on January 10, 1864. A number of Plummer's associates were lynched and others banished on pain of death if they ever returned. Twenty-two individuals were accused, informally tried, and hanged by the Vigilance Committee (the Montana Vigilantes) of Bannack and Virginia City. Nathaniel Pitt Langford, the first superintendent of Yellowstone National Park, was a member of that vigilance committee.

A number of mining camps dotted the banks of Grasshopper Creek during the gold booms, starting at Bannack downstream almost to where the stream joins Beaverhead River. While many were short lived and considered just extensions of Bannack, others were designated towns of their own. Yankee Flats adjoined Bannack and was referred to as an "addition" to Bannack. By the following March, a townsite company had laid out and platted Centerville. However, Marysville, named for early arrival Mary Wadam, gained more people and so contemporary maps alternately used the name on record, Centerville, or the name used by locals, Marysville. Dogtown was south of and "near" Bannack in 1866. It was named for the numerous stray dogs, and had a blacksmith shop, saloon, and grocery store.

State park
Sixty historic log, brick, and frame structures remain standing in Bannack, many quite well preserved; most can be explored. The site, now the Bannack Historic District, was declared a National Historic Landmark in 1961. It joined the roster of Montana state parks in 1954. Volunteers work in conjunction with the state to preserve the fabled ghost town.

Bannack Days
Every year, during the third weekend of July, this abandoned town witnesses a historical reconstitution known as "Bannack Days". For two days, Bannack State Park officials organize an event that attempts to revive the times when Bannack was a boom town, re-enacting the day-to-day lives of the miners who lived there during the gold rush. An authentic, old-fashioned breakfast is served in the old Hotel Meade, a well-preserved brick building which was for many years the seat of Beaverhead County, before it became Dillon, Montana.

Physiography

Gallery

See also
 List of ghost towns in Montana
 Montana Ghost Town Preservation Society
 List of National Historic Landmarks in Montana
 National Register of Historic Places listings in Beaverhead County, Montana

References

Bibliography

External links

Bannack State Park Montana Fish, Wildlife & Parks
Bannack State Park Bannack State Park and Bannack Association

Populated places in Beaverhead County, Montana
Ghost towns in Montana
Populated places established in 1862
Historic districts on the National Register of Historic Places in Montana
National Historic Landmarks in Montana
Former colonial and territorial capitals in the United States
Mining communities in Montana
Gold mining in the United States
Open-air museums in Montana
Symbols of Montana
1862 establishments in Washington Territory
National Register of Historic Places in Beaverhead County, Montana
Populated places on the National Register of Historic Places in Montana